John David Voigt (born May 17, 1966) is an American former professional baseball outfielder and the current hitting coach for the Las Vegas 51s. He played all or part of seven seasons in the majors, from 1992 until 1998, for the Baltimore Orioles, Texas Rangers, Milwaukee Brewers, and Oakland Athletics of Major League Baseball (MLB). He currently works in the New York Mets organization as their outfield/baserunning coordinator.

Since his playing career ended in 2000, Voigt has continued to work in minor league baseball as a coach, instructor, and manager. In 2002, he managed the Frederick Keys, a team in the Orioles farm system. He was originally hired by the Mets in 2006 as a scout. From 2007 until 2010, Voigt served as hitting coach for the New Orleans Zephyrs, Brooklyn Cyclones and Buffalo Bisons. He was named to the position of outfield/baserunning coordinator on February 21, 2011.

External links

1966 births
Living people
American expatriate baseball players in Canada
Baltimore Orioles players
Baseball coaches from Florida
Baseball players from Florida
Brooklyn Cyclones coaches
Bowie Baysox players
Charlotte Rangers players
Edmonton Trappers players
Frederick Keys players
Fresno Grizzlies players
Hagerstown Suns players
LSU Tigers baseball players
Major League Baseball outfielders
Minor league baseball managers
Milwaukee Brewers players
Newark Orioles players
Oakland Athletics players
Oklahoma City 89ers players
Oklahoma RedHawks players
Rochester Red Wings players
Schaumburg Flyers players
Sportspeople from Sarasota, Florida
Texas Rangers players
Tucson Toros players
Tulsa Drillers players